David Wood (born April 15, 1961) is an American politician. He was a member of the Missouri House of Representatives, who served from 2013 to 2021. He is a member of the Republican Party.

References

Living people
Republican Party members of the Missouri House of Representatives
1961 births
21st-century American politicians
People from Jefferson City, Missouri
People from Versailles, Missouri